Monika Kuliš (born 20 April 1995) is a Bosnian football midfielder who plays SFK 2000.

External links 
 

1995 births
Living people
Bosnia and Herzegovina women's footballers
Women's association football midfielders
Bosnia and Herzegovina women's international footballers